Bruinsmia is a small genus of trees in the family Styracaceae.

Description
Bruinsmia species grow as trees with flattened twigs. The flowers are green or white. The fruits are fleshy.

Distribution
Bruinsmia species grow naturally in Nepal, India, China, Indochina, Malesia and New Guinea.

Species
The Plant List and Catalogue of Life recognise 2 accepted species:
 Bruinsmia polysperma 
 Bruinsmia styracoides

References

Styracaceae
Ericales genera
Taxa named by Jacob Gijsbert Boerlage